Sinding is a surname. Notable people with the surname include:

Christian Sinding (1856–1941), Norwegian composer
Otto Sinding (1842–1909), Norwegian painter
Stephan Sinding (1846–1922), Norwegian sculptor, brother of Christian and Otto
Tore Sinding (1903–1969), Norwegian pianist and composer